The Luxembourg women's national football team represents Luxembourg in international women's football.

Luxembourg women's national football team was founded in 2003, and played its first international game in 2006. It have been managed by Dan Santos since 2020.

History

The beginning
Luxembourg made their debut in the qualifying for the European Championships in 2009. Luxembourg were drawn in a group with Slovakia, Lithuania and Malta. Luxembourg finished in second place in the group. Luxembourg failed to qualify for the World Cup in Germany.

Results and fixtures

The following is a list of match results in the last 12 months, as well as any future matches that have been scheduled.

Legend

2022

2023

Luxembourg Results and Fixtures – Soccerway.com
 Luxembourg Results and Fixtures – FIFA.com

Coaching staff

Current coaching staff

Manager history
 Romain Jean (2006–2012)
 Ray Pye (2012–2017)
 Samy Smaïli (2017–2020)
 Dan Santos (2020–)

Players

Current squad
The following players were named for the friendlies against  on 17 and 20 February 2023.

Caps and goals accurate as of match against  on 20 February 2023.

Notes
INJ = Withdrew due to injury
PRE = Preliminary squad / standby
RET = Retired from the national team
SUS = Serving suspension
WD = Player withdrew from the squad due to non-injury issue.

Recent call-ups
The following players have been called up to the squad in the past 12 months.

Records

*Active players in bold, statistics correct as of 20 February 2023.

Most capped players

Top goalscorers

Competitive record

FIFA Women's World Cup

*Draws include knockout matches decided on penalty kicks.

UEFA Women's Championship

*Draws include knockout matches decided on penalty kicks.

See also
Sport in Luxembourg
Football in Luxembourg
Women's Football in Luxembourg
Luxembourg women's national football team
Luxembourg women's national football team results
List of Luxembourg women's international footballers
Luxembourg women's national under-20 football team
Luxembourg women's national under-17 football team
Luxembourg men's national football team

References

External links
Official website
FIFA profile

 
European women's national association football teams
national football team